Mobstability is a collaborative studio album by American rapper Twista and fellow Chicago-based hip hop group the Speedknot Mobstaz. It was released on October 6, 1998 via Atlantic Records. Production was handled entirely by The Legendary Traxster, with Leroy Burton serving as executive producer. It features guest appearances from Christopher Williams, Danny Boy, NewSense and Shock The World. The album peaked at number 34 on the Billboard 200 and number 9 on the Top R&B/Hip-Hop Albums. Its lead single, "In Your World", peaked at No. 101 on the Billboard Hot 100 and appeared on the Dr. Dolittle: The Album soundtrack.

Track listing

Personnel
Carl "Twista" Mitchell – main artist
Calvin "Liffy Stokes" Thomas – main artist
Jabari "Mayze" Bristow – main artist
Samuel "The Legendary Traxster" Lindley – producer, engineering, mixing
Darnell "Cayex" Evans – engineering assistant
Frederick "Toxic" Taylor – engineering assistant
Brian "Big Bass" Gardner – mastering
Leroy Burton – executive producer
Victor Hall – art direction, photography
Mike Caren – A&R
Corinthia "Newsense" Federick – featured artist (track 2)
"Danny Boy" Steward – featured artist (track 4)
Troy Christopher Williams – featured artist (track 5)
Shock The World – featured artist (track 11)
Baby Boy – additional vocals (track 10)
Vicky – additional vocals (track 13)

Charts

References

External links

1998 albums
Twista albums
Speedknot Mobstaz albums
Albums produced by The Legendary Traxster
Big Beat Records (American record label) albums